Ernst Vanhöffen (15 November 1858, in Wehlau – 14 June 1918) was a German zoologist.

He studied geology, botany and zoology at the universities of Berlin and Königsberg, graduating in 1888 with the thesis Untersuchungen über semaeostome und rhizostome Medusen. In 1889–90 he conducted research of jellyfish at the Stazione Zoologica Anton Dohrn in Naples.

In 1892–93 he participated in a Gesellschaft für Erdkunde zu Berlin-sponsored expedition to West Greenland under the leadership of Erich von Drygalski (1865–1949). Afterwards, he worked for a few years at the Institute of Zoology in Kiel. In 1898–99 he took part in the Deutschen Tiefsee-Expedition aboard the steamship "Valdivia". From an abundant yield of deep-sea marine fauna collected on the expedition, Vanhöffen was tasked with processing medusa species.

After his return to Germany, he served as a lecturer at the University of Kiel, attaining the title of professor in March 1901. From August 1901 to November 1903 he was a member of the Deutschen Südpolar-Expedition aboard the research vessel "Gauss". Led by Erich von Drygalski, the expedition endured periods of hardship due to the "Gauss" being trapped in Antarctic ice for several months. Vanhoffen Bluff (Coordinates: 53°0′S 73°21′E) was named in his honor.

Written works 
 Untersuchungen über semaeostome und rhizostome Medusen, 1888 – Analysis of Semaeostomeae and Rhizostome medusae. (graduate thesis).
 Die akalephen der Plankton-expedition, 1892 – Acalephae from the "Plankton-expedition".
 Die acraspeden Medusen der deutschen Tiefsee-Expedition 1898–1899. Mit Tafel I-VIII, 1902 – Craspedota medusae from the German Deep-sea Expedition 1898–1899.
 Die Anthomedusen und Leptomedusen der Deutschen Tiefsee-Expedition 1898–1899, 1911 – Anthomedusae and Leptomedusae from the German Deep-sea Expedition 1898–1899. 
 Die Craspedoten Medusen der Deutschen Südpolar-Expedition 1901–1903, 1912 – Craspedota medusae from the German South Polar Expedition 1901–1903.
 Die Isopoden der Deutschen Südpolar-Expedition, 1901–1903, 1914 – Isopoda from the German South Polar Expedition 1901–1903.

Taxon described by him
See :Category:Taxa named by Ernst Vanhöffen

Taxon named in his honor 
Diaphus vanhoeffeni, is a species of lanternfish found in the Eastern Atlantic Ocean.

References 
 Deutsche Südpolar-Expedition by Erich von Drygalski
 "Parts of this article are based on a translation of a similar article at the German Wikipedia".

External links 
 The Hydrozoa Directory List of some species described by Vanhöffen.

People from Gvardeysky District
People from East Prussia
19th-century German zoologists
Academic staff of the University of Kiel
1858 births
1918 deaths
Humboldt University of Berlin alumni
University of Königsberg alumni
German explorers
20th-century German zoologists